South Mountain State Park is a public recreation area that runs for nearly the entire length of South Mountain through Washington and Frederick counties in Maryland. The state park is contiguous with several other national, state and local parks on the mountain, including the Chesapeake and Ohio Canal National Historical Park, Gathland State Park, Washington Monument State Park, Greenbrier State Park and Pen Mar County Park (Washington County).

Features
Maryland's  section of the Appalachian Trail traverses the length of the park, offering access to scenic overlooks that include High Rock, Black Rock, Annapolis Rock, White Rock, and Weverton Cliffs. The park also contains part of the South Mountain Battlefield. Camping is permitted at shelters and backpackers campgrounds off the AT. The park also has two hunting areas: Black Rock Hunting Lands and Lambs Knoll Hunting Lands.

References

External links
 South Mountain State Park Maryland Department of Natural Resources

State parks of Maryland
South Mountain Range (Maryland−Pennsylvania)
Parks in Frederick County, Maryland
Parks in Washington County, Maryland
Journey Through Hallowed Ground National Heritage Area
State parks of the Appalachians
IUCN Category V